Tranoroa is a town and commune in Madagascar. It belongs to the district of Beloha, which is a part of Androy Region. It is situated at the Menarandra River and the Route Nationale No.10. The population of the commune was estimated to be approximately 18,000 in 2001 commune census.

Primary and junior level secondary education are available in town. It is also a site of industrial-scale  mining. Farming and raising livestock provides employment for 45% and 45% of the working population. The most important crops are maize and peanuts; also cassava is an important agricultural product. Industry and services provide employment for 2% and 8% of the population, respectively.

References and notes 

Populated places in Androy